The 1986 Taipei Women's Championships was a women's tennis tournament played on indoor carpet courts in Taipei, Taiwan and was part of the 1986 Virginia Slims World Championship Series. It was the inaugural edition of the tournament and was held from 6 October through 12 October 1986. Unseeded Patricia Hy won the singles title.

Finals

Singles
 Patricia Hy defeated  Adriana Villagrán 6–7(6–8), 6–2, 6–3
 It was Hy's only singles title of her career.

Doubles
 Lea Antonoplis /  Barbara Gerken defeated  Gigi Fernández /  Susan Leo 6–1, 6–2
 It was Antonoplis' 1st doubles title of the year and the 3rd of her career. It was Gerken's only doubles title of her career.

References

External links
 ITF tournament edition details
 Tournament draws

Taipei Women's Championship
Taipei Women's Championship
1986 in Taiwanese tennis